The 1991–92 Soviet League season was the 46th and final season of the Soviet Championship League, the top level of ice hockey in the Soviet Union. This season was also known as the first and only one of the Ice Hockey Championship of the Commonwealth of Independent States (CIS), as the Soviet Union dissolved during the season, and the championship was continued by the Commonwealth of Independent States. 16 teams participated in the league, and Dynamo Moscow won the championship.

Regular season

First round

Second round

Playoffs

Classification games
Torpedo Nizhny Novgorod - Krylya Sovetov Moscow 3-1 on series
Traktor Chelyabinsk - Torpedo Ust-Kamenogorsk 3-0 on series
5th place
Traktor Chelyabinsk – Torpedo Nizhny Novgorod 3–2 on series
7th place
Krylya Sovetov Moscow – Torpedo Ust-Kamenogorsk 3–0 on series

External links
Season on hockeyarchives.info
Season on hockeystars.ru
Season on hockeyarchives.ru

1991–92 in Soviet ice hockey
Soviet League seasons
Sov
Ice Hockey